Bron Studios (stylized as BRON) is a Canadian motion picture company based in British Columbia owned by Bron Media Corporation. Bron's notable productions include Joker, Bombshell, Queen & Slim, Greyhound, Judas and the Black Messiah, The Mule, Henchmen,  Roman J. Israel, Esq., Rudderless, Welcome to Me, The Addams Family, The Willoughbys, and Ghostbusters: Afterlife.

Bron Creative is a joint venture between Bron Studios and Creative Wealth Media. Bron Creative provides equity for studio productions and senior secured debt financing on appropriate film and television productions.

History

Bron Studios
Bron Studios was founded in 2010 by Aaron Gilbert and Brenda Gilbert. Bron formed Bron Animation division led by Gil Rimmer and Ben Burden Smith as creative directors. The division's first project was two Mighty Mighty Monsters specials.

Bron Media
In September 2017, Bron Studios was reorganized with Bron Media Corp. becoming Bron Studios' parent company. Genre label the Realm, Bron Releasing and Bron Animation joined the studio as Bron Media subsidiaries. Daniel D. McClure was also hired as president and chief operating officer from his position as Toronto-based CQI Capital Management CEO.

Its Bron Venture unit invested in starting up Media Res, Michael Ellenberg's TV and film production company in June 2017. Bron would also find financing for the start up's projects.

By 2016, Bron Media and Creative Wealth Media form a joint venture, Bron Creative, to fund films. The venture's first film is Fences by Paramount Pictures.  Next, the venture agreed to fully finance an animated film series, up to four films, based on Bear Grylls produced by YBG Films, a joint venture between Grylls and Platinum Films. In December 2018, Bron Creative and Warner Bros. agreed to a six film slate deal with $100 million in co-financing. Bron Creative agreed to another $100 million co-financing slate deal with MGM in June 2019.

Bron TV 
In the late 2010s, Bron began developing an internal television production group and partnered with producer and former HBO executive Michael Ellenberg's production company Media Res. Bron coproduced a series of international projects at this time. In 2019 and 2020, furthered expanded their television venture into a formal division.

Management 
Bron Studios was founded by Brenda and Aaron L. Gilbert. Aaron is a Canadian producer, executive producer, and financier of live-action and animated motion pictures and series television. In addition to Bron, Gilbert is also the Managing Director of Media House Capital, a senior lender in the film and television business.

Originally from London, Ontario, Canada, Gilbert moved to Los Angeles and Vancouver in 1994, beginning his career in the music management and music publishing industry with BOXX Entertainment before segueing into music supervision and licensing for film/television later in the 1990s, and then into animation and live-action business affairs and finance. Music continues to be influential in his creative and project choices.

Gilbert has been a producer and executive producer of recent films including Beatriz at Dinner, Fences, The Birth of a Nation, Kill Me 3 Times, Son of a Gun, Miss Julie, Elsa & Fred, Ginger & Rosa, The English Teacher, Lullaby, Supremacy, Janie Jones, Decoding Annie Parker, I Melt With You, and DayDream Nation.

Filmography

Bron Studios
Paradox (2010)
Jabberwock (2011)
Foreverland (2011)
Trust Me (co-produced) (2013)
A Single Shot (2013)
Mighty Mighty Monsters in New Fears Eve (2013)
 Mighty Mighty Monsters in Halloween Havoc (2013)
 Rudderless (2014)
Welcome to Me (2014)
Tell (2014)
Mighty Mighty Monsters in Pranks for the Memories (2015)
I Saw the Light (2015)
Into the Forest (2015)
Meadowland (2015)
The Driftless Area (2015)
Tumbledown (2015)
Hyena Road (2015)
Ithaca (2015)
 The Birth of a Nation (2016)
Special Correspondents (2016)
Una (2016)
The Cleanse (2016)
The Philosophy of Phil (2017)
Beatriz at Dinner (2017)
The Layover (2017)
Parallel (2018)
Drunk Parents (2018)
 Leave No Trace (2018)
Monster (2018)
Prospect (2018)
To Dust (2018)
 Tully (2018)
The Spy Who Dumped Me (2018)
The Nightingale (2018)
A Simple Favor (2018)
 The Front Runner (2018)
Assassination Nation (2018)
 Henchmen (film) (2018)
 The Red Sea Diving Resort (2019)
 Bombshell (2019)
 The Willoughbys (2020)
 Capone (2020)
 Pieces of a Woman (2020)
 Those Who Wish Me Dead (2021)
 The Survivor (2021)
 A Journal for Jordan (2021)
 Americana (2023)
 Monkey Man (2023)
 Solitary (TBA)
 Surrounded (TBA)
Teddy (TBA)

Bron Creative
 Fences (2016) Paramount Pictures 
Roman J. Israel, Esq. (2017) Columbia Pictures
The Mule (2018) Warner Bros.
Isn't It Romantic (2019) Warner Bros./New Line Cinema/Netflix
Child's Play (2019) Orion Pictures
The Kitchen (2019) Warner Bros./New Line Cinema
Joker (2019) Warner Bros.
The Good Liar (2019) Warner Bros./New Line Cinema
The Addams Family (2019) Metro-Goldwyn-Mayer
Queen & Slim (2019) Universal Pictures
Greyhound (2020) Apple TV+
Gretel & Hansel (2020) Orion Pictures
The Way Back (2020)  Warner Bros.
Superintelligence (2020) HBO Max/Warner Bros./New Line Cinema
Bad Trip (2021) Orion Pictures/Netflix (uncredited)
Candyman (2021) Universal Pictures/MGM
Respect (2021) MGM
House of Gucci (2021) MGM
Cyrano (2021) MGM
Licorice Pizza (2021) MGM/Focus Features
Chaos Walking (2021) Lionsgate (uncredited)
The Addams Family 2 (2021) Metro-Goldwyn-Mayer
Ghostbusters: Afterlife (2021) Columbia Pictures
Judas and the Black Messiah (2021) Warner Bros.
65 (2023) Columbia Pictures
Legally Blonde 3 (TBA) MGM
Joker: Folie à Deux (2024) Warner Bros.
Robocop Returns (TBA) MGM/Orion Pictures

See also
Mad Solar

Notes

References

External links 
 

2010 establishments in British Columbia
Canadian companies established in 2010
Companies based in Vancouver
Film production companies of Canada
Mass media companies established in 2010